Yannan Subdistrict is a subdistrict in Chengguan District, Lanzhou, Gansu, China. , it administers the following seven residential neighborhoods and four villages:
Neighborhoods
Yanning Road Community
Tanjianzi Community
Dayantan Community
Shawahe Community
Zhangsutan Community
Tianqing Jiayuan Community
Nanhe Community

Villages
Zhangsutan Village
Tanjianzi Village
Dayantan Village
Shawahe Village

See also 
 List of township-level divisions of Gansu

References 

Township-level divisions of Gansu
Geography of Lanzhou
Subdistricts of the People's Republic of China